The 1971 Hammersmith Council election took place on 13 May 1971 to elect members of Hammersmith London Borough Council in London, England. The whole council was up for election and the Labour party gained overall control of the council.

Election result
The Labour Party won 58 seats - a gain of 52 seats from the previous election, taking control of the council.
The Conservative Party won 2 seats (the Avonmore ward) - a loss of 52 seats from their previous result, and lost control of the council.

The Liberal Party stood candidates in three wards, and a single candidate stood for the Communist Party, but none of these won a seat.

Ward results

Addison

Avonmore

Broadway

Brook Green

Colehill

College Park & Old Oak

Coningham

Crabtree

Gibbs Green

Grove

Halford

Margravine

Parsons Green

St Stephen's

Sandford

Sherbrooke

Starch Green

Sulivan

Town

White City

Wormholt

References

1971
1971 London Borough council elections
20th century in the London Borough of Hammersmith and Fulham